WSRZ-FM (107.9 MHz) is a radio station broadcasting a classic hits format. Licensed to Coral Cove, Florida, United States, the station serves the Sarasota/Bradenton, Florida area.  The station is currently owned by iHeartMedia, Inc.

History
The station began on 106.3 FM as WMLO (branding as mellow) in 1982 as a lite Adult Contemporary station. The station switched to oldies in 1984 and its frequency moved to 106.5 FM. In September 1986, the station changed its call letters to WSRZ, and carried a Top 40 format known as Z-106 after Robert Weeks (former owner of the station) sold the station to Sarasota Radio Partners Inc. The station was affiliated with Rick Dees Weekly Top 40 since WSRZ's debut as a Top 40 station, one out of 2 stations in the Tampa Bay area. Although, WSRZ didn't go full-time CHR until 1988.

The CHR format was unsuccessful for the station. As at that point, CHR listeners were chosen to listen to WRBQ or later WFLZ (The Power Pig) with medium-to-strong signals in the Sarasota-Bradenton areas, and WINK-FM with medium-to-strong signals in the Venice area. As WSRZ was rebranded back to its oldies station in 1990, WSRZ was originally located at 106.5 MHz, known as 'Oldies 106' and played music from the 1950s to the early 1970s. Weekend specialty programming included street corner harmony "Doo Wop". In 1999, a major shift was done among Clear Channel stations, with Country WCTQ (92 CTQ) moving to the superior 106.5 position, WSRZ moving to the slightly smaller 107.9 position, and the hard rocker WYNF moving from 107.9 to the newly created (and much lower powered) 105.9.  92.1 adopted an easy listening format as "The Dove".
 
After moving to its current 107.9 frequency, WSRZ-FM was then renamed as "Oldies 108" and the station returned to its original oldies format after its two-year run as WMLO from 1984 until 1986, continuing to focus on music from the 1950s through the early 1970s. In early 2007, the moniker was changed to the present "107.9 WSRZ", dropping music from the 1950s and early 1960s; the current format is classic hits, focusing on music from the late-1960s through the late 1980s with some 1990s hits.

Currently, there is only one live show on 107.9,  Jones & Company. All other shows are voice tracked.

Jones and Company
One of the station's main in-house productions is Jones and Company, formerly known as The Jones and Crane Morning Show prior to Christina Crane's retirement in 2017. It is a weekday morning show, currently featuring David Jones and Meredith Michaels. The hosts have incorporated numerous fundraising and community service related causes into the show, including an annual toy and fund drive benefiting The Safe Children's Coalition-Sarasota YMCA and an annual blood drive benefiting the Suncoast Community Blood Bank, and the hosts frequently throw parties for listeners on Friday nights.

References

External links

SRZ-FM
Radio stations established in 1991
IHeartMedia radio stations
1991 establishments in Florida